Beishi may refer to:

Locations in mainland China or Taiwan
Beishi District (北市区), Baoding, Hebei
Beishi River (北勢溪), tributary of the Xindian River in northern Taiwan
Beishi, Guangning County (北市镇), town in Guangdong
Beishi, Xingye County (北市镇), town in Guangxi
Beishi, Gaoping (北诗镇), town in Shanxi
Subdistricts (北市街道)
Beishi Subdistrict, Lu'an, in Yu'an District, Lu'an, Anhui
Beishi Subdistrict, Shenyang, in Heping District, Shenyang, Liaoning

Others
History of Northern Dynasties, or Bei Shi (北史), one of the official Chinese historical works of the Twenty-Four Histories